Doombringer is a live album by Swedish grindcore band Nasum, recorded in Osaka, Japan in January 2004. It was released in 2008, after the death of Mieszko Talarczyk during the 2004 Tsunami, and after the disbanding of Nasum.

Track listing

References

Nasum albums
2008 live albums
Relapse Records live albums